List of the published work of George Packer, American journalist, novelist, and playwright.

Books
 
 
 
 
 
 
 
 
 
 
 
 
Reprints

Essays and reporting
  Hillary Clinton stepping down as Secretary of State.
  Boston Marathon bombing

Notes

Bibliographies by writer
Bibliographies of American writers